is a former Japanese footballer who last played for Japanese club Nagano Parceiro.　He was named J2's Rookie of the Year for 2008.

Career statistics
Updated to 2 February 2018.

References

External links
Profile at Nagano Parceiro

1985 births
Living people
Senshu University alumni
Association football people from Shizuoka Prefecture
Japanese footballers
J1 League players
J2 League players
J3 League players
Mito HollyHock players
Júbilo Iwata players
JEF United Chiba players
Fagiano Okayama players
Matsumoto Yamaga FC players
Oita Trinita players
AC Nagano Parceiro players
Association football forwards